Bang Chueak Nang is one of the six khwaengs (subdistricts) of Taling Chan District in Bangkok's Thonburi side. The subdistrict contained 12 administrative villages.

History and toponymy
Its name after Khlong Bang Chueak Nang that flows through the southern area and considered to be the main watercourse of locals. The khlong that separates from the Khlong Mon to the south, along with Khlong Bang Noi which separates to the west.

Khlong Bang Chuek Nang  has a starting point from the Wat Ko temple and long flowing as far as converging with Khlong Thawi Watthana in the area of Thawi Watthana District.

Bang Chueak Nang is an area with a history of more than 500 years, along with the neighbouring Bang Ramat. They are mentioned in Kamsuan Samut, an ancient literature from the early Ayutthaya period; and are hence considered as two of the oldest communities in Bangkok. Despite the name Bang Chueak Nang literally meaning "place of leather ropes" in the present-day Thai language; in Kamsuan Samut, the area was called Bang Chanang (บางฉนัง). The word chanang is a borrowing from the Khmer chhnang meaning "pottery". Therefore, assuming that the name Bang Chanang was not, in turn, a corruption of any previous name, the earliest people living in the area could be dedicated to pottery production.

Originally, Bang Chueak Nang was a tambon of Amphoe Taling Chan of Thon Buri Province. Later, the new government administration regulations were revised in 1985. Bang Chueak Nang therefore changed its tambon status to that of a khwaeng of Khet Taling Chan as it is today.

Geography
Bang Chueak Nang can be considered as a southernmost area of the district, with a total area of 2,178.75 rai (about 861 acres), divided into agricultural areas 1,183 rai (about 467 acres).

Neighbouring subdistricts are (from north clockwise): Bang Phrom in its district, Bang Waek, Khlong Khwang, Bang Phai of Phasi Charoen District, and Thawi Watthana of Thawi Watthana District.

Most of the area are vegetable gardens.

There are three elementary schools, three Thai temples, and one Christian church.

Economy
Bang Chueak Nang residents work in agriculture, government service and trade.

Transport
Ratchaphruek Road
Phutthamonthon Sai 1 Road
Phran Nok–Phutthamonthan Sai 4 Road
Kanchanaphisek Road (Outer Ring Road)
Bang Chueak Nang Road
Soi Bang Chueak Nang 9 (Ngoen Udom/ Siri Watthana)

References

Taling Chan district
Subdistricts of Bangkok